Kishori Lal may be:
Kishori Lal, 1912–1990, Indian freedom fighter

Politicians 
Kishori Lal (Baijnath politician)
Kishori Lal (Kullu politician)